Cova des Coloms (Cave of the pigeons in Catalan) is a natural cave located in the Spanish island Menorca, in the gully of Binigaus,  that has been declared Bien de Interés Cultural. It can be reached by walk from the village of Es Migjorn Gran following the path that goes to the beach of Binigaus.

Location 
The cave is located in the gully of Binigaus, approximately 1 mile southeast from Es Migjorn Gran and its access is free. The closest car park is the one of the local graveyard. The path is signposted in a private gravel road. In the crossing of the path that leads to the cave's entrance, the town hall has placed an information sign in Catalan, Spanish and English.

Description 

The cave is 110-metre-deep, 15-metre-wide and 24-metre-high. For its sizes, it is also known as "the Cathedral". It is divided into two zones: the central room (about 50m deep) followed by a long and narrow corridor.

The cave was a burial site in the Talaiotic Period (550-123 ACN). The French prehistorian Émile Cartailhac found in the 1890s ceramic and human bones. The excavation by Antonio Vives Escudero (1859-1925) in 1914-1915 found ceramic vessels and two bronze objects.

The cave has been protected since 1966 as a Bien de Interés Cultural, with register number by the Spanish Ministry of Culture RI-51-0003660.

References

External links 

 How to get there
 Sa Cova d’es Coloms on the website Islas Baleares

Landforms of Menorca